"Come Running" is a song written by singer-songwriter Van Morrison and included on his 1970 album Moondance.

"Come Running" was also the only song to survive the Astral Weeks demos for Warner Bros. in 1968.

Recording
The song was first recorded at the Warners Publishing Studio, New York in early 1969 with Morrison's producer at the time, Lewis Merenstein. It was then rerecorded in both the spring and summer sessions in the same year, before Morrison returned to the track in the September to November sessions at the A&R Recording Studios, 46th Street, New York, that resulted in the recording of most of the tracks that were released on Moondance.

Composition
"Come Running" is composed in the key of A major, with a chord progression of A-D-A-D-A-D-A-D-A-D-A-E-D, which changes at the coda to A-F#m-A-D-F#m-Bm-D-A. The song has a bright rock tempo in 4/4 time, which slows at the three bar coda.

Morrison described it as "a very light type of song.  It's not too heavy.  It's just a happy-go-lucky song.  There are no messages or anything like that." Brian Hinton's interpretation of the song was more complex:  "The imagery is just like that at the end of "Madame George", a train passing, wind and rain ... an image of implacable nature against which human life and death play out their little games.  Van and his lover 'dream that it will never end'  while knowing that of course it will. Even the injunction to  'put away all your walking shoes' has a temporary sound to it."

The lyrics "you come running to me, you'll come running to me" were later reused in the 1987 track "Queen of the Slipstream".

Single release
Biographer Clinton Heylin remarked that "the lower rung chart success of the "Come Running" 45 hardly accounts for the album's [Moondance] immediate acceptance by a whole new spectrum of young adult listeners." The single peaked at number 39 on the Billboard Hot 100 singles chart.

Personnel
Van Morrison – tambourine, vocals
John Klingberg – bass
Jeff Labes – piano
Gary Mallaber – drums
Guy Masson – conga
John Platania – guitar
Jack Schroer – alto saxophone
Collin Tilton – tenor saxophone

Notes

References
DeWitt, Howard A. (1983). Van Morrison: The Mystic's Music, Horizon Books, 
Heylin, Clinton (2003). Can You Feel the Silence? Van Morrison: A New Biography,  Chicago Review Press 
Hinton, Brian (1997). Celtic Crossroads: The Art of Van Morrison,  Sanctuary, 
Mills, Peter (2010), Hymns to the Silence: Inside the Words and Music of Van Morrison, London: Continuum, 
Van Morrison Anthology, Los Angeles: Alfred Music Publishing, 1999, 

1970 singles
Songs written by Van Morrison
Van Morrison songs
1969 songs
Warner Records singles
Song recordings produced by Lewis Merenstein
Song recordings produced by Van Morrison